Luigi Apolloni (born 2 May 1967) is an Italian football manager and former player, who played as a centre-back. At club level, Apolloni is mainly remembered for his time with Italian side Parma Calcio 1913, where he won several titles during his 13 seasons with the club. At international level, he was a member of the Italy national football team that reached the final of the 1994 FIFA World Cup.

Club career
Born in Frascati, Apolloni started his career with Lodigiani in 1983–84 in Serie C2, without ever get off the field in the first team to advance to Pistoiese within two years, where he debuted in professional football.

After another year in Serie C1 to Reggiana, he joined Parma in 1987, became a key member of the squad and a mainstay in the team's defensive lineup alongside Lorenzo Minotti; the two players formed a notable central defensive partnership at the club, helping to guide the team from the Serie B to Serie A, and eventually, to the top levels of European football. Their time at the club included triumphs in the 1991–92 Coppa Italia, a Cup Winners' Cup and UEFA Super Cup in 1993, a runners-up medal in their 1993–94 European Cup Winners' Cup campaign, and two UEFA Cups in 1995 and 1999, as well as the Supercoppa Italiana and another Coppa Italia in 1999, a runners-up medal in the 1995 Supercoppa Italiana, and third and second-place finishes in Serie A in 1995 and 1997 respectively.

In 1996 a serious injury forced him out, and Apolloni did not manage to win back a place in the starting lineup, ultimately leaving Parma in 1999 to join Hellas Verona, and later ending his career in 2001 with a total of 255 appearances and 7 goals in the Italian top flight.

International career
Following his successes with Parma, Apolloni gained a spot in the Italian squad under head coach Arrigo Sacchi, making his international debut on 27 May 1994, in a 2–0 home win against Finland, coincidentally in Parma. Overall, he made 15 appearances for Italy between 1994 and 1996, and was a member of the azzurri squad that took part at the 1994 FIFA World Cup, where they reached the final, in which he appeared, only to lose to Brazil on penalties. He was also a part of their less successful Euro 1996 campaign, appearing in Italy's opening two group matches, a 2–1 win over a Russia, and a 2–1 defeat to eventual runners-up the Czech Republic, in which he was sent off; the Italians were eliminated in the first round of the tournament.

Managerial career
In 2006 Apolloni accepted to follow former Parma teammate Daniele Zoratto, serving as his aide at Modena. He was later sacked together with head coach Zoratto in February 2007, only to return at Modena in April 2008.

In January 2009, Apolloni was appointed as caretaker manager of the canarini after Zoratto left the club by mutual consent. He was then permanently appointed to the role after he managed to guide Modena to escape relegation at the final day of the season. In his first full season in charge of the club, Apolloni guided Modena to a mid-table place in the league despite severe financial issues within the club. In July 2010 he left Modena to join ambitious Serie B club Grosseto. He was however removed by the end of September due to poor results, and replaced by Francesco Moriero.

On 2 April 2012, he was appointed as new head coach of Gubbio in the Italian Serie B league until the end of the season, thus becoming the fourth manager of the season for the small relegation-threatened Umbrian club (after Fabio Pecchia, Luigi Simoni and Marco Alessandrini).

On 31 May 2018, Apolloni was appointed as the manager of Modena. It lasted until 10 January 2019, where he was fired.

Managerial statistics

Honours

Player
Parma
 Coppa Italia: 1991–92, 1998–99
 Supercoppa Italiana: 1999
 UEFA Cup: 1994–95, 1998–99
 UEFA Cup Winners' Cup: 1992–93
 UEFA Super Cup: 1993

References

External links
 
 
 

1967 births
Living people
People from Frascati
Italian footballers
Association football defenders
A.S. Lodigiani players
A.C. Reggiana 1919 players
1994 FIFA World Cup players
Hellas Verona F.C. players
Serie A players
Serie B players
Serie C players
Parma Calcio 1913 players
U.S. Pistoiese 1921 players
Modena F.C. managers
F.C. Grosseto S.S.D. managers
UEFA Euro 1996 players
Italy international footballers
Italian football managers
Italian expatriate football managers
ND Gorica managers
Parma Calcio 1913 managers
Expatriate football managers in Slovenia
Italian expatriate sportspeople in Slovenia
UEFA Cup winning players
Footballers from Lazio
Sportspeople from the Metropolitan City of Rome Capital